Rajadhani may refer to:

 Rajdhani (film), 1956 Indian film
 Rajadhani (1994 film), a Malayalam-language film directed by Joshy Mathew, starring Babu Antony and Charmila
 Rajadhani (2011 film), a Kannada-language film directed by Sowmya Sathyan.N.R, starring Yash and Sheena Shahabadi
 Rajdhani Express, premium passenger train service in India
 Rajadhani Express, a railway service provider in Sri Lanka

See also 
 Rajdhani (disambiguation)